Clan MacTavish is an Ancient Highland Scottish clan.

History

Origins
Notwithstanding several and varied origin traditions, the MacTavishes may have come from Ireland to Scotland during the years of the Scoto-Irish settlement era. Very old Irish forms (O.F. Gaeilge) of MacTavish are given by Father Patrick Woulfe in his widely accepted work on Irish Surnames. Wolfe gives several old forms (O.F.) of the name, showing nominative, genitive, and accusative forms, eight in all, along with their modified and modern equivalents.

Substantiating this is the 15th or 16th-century document writ known as the Cert Ui Neill (Irish), taken from much older Irish documents, and refers to past times rather than the contemporary. There is a reference to the MacTavish (O.F.) holding lands in Ros Buill (the old kingdom of Ross Guill) now encompassing part of County Donegal. The translation of the Ceart is found in Studia Celtica. John O'Hart also gives two forms of the modern MacTavish, as well as an old form in Irish Pedigrees, The Origin and Stem of the Irish Nation

Another source for an Irish MacTavish origin is the Topographical Poems of O’Dubhagain, c. 1372, which illustrates what the origin of the MacTavishes appears to be. Under the subheading of "The Part of the Tir Chonaill", that is Conal Gulban's Land (often cited as what is now County Donegal, Ireland) is this entry on page 43, "To MacGillatsamhais the stout Belong Ros-Guill and Ros-Iroguil". Ros-Guill and Ros-Irguill, agreeing with the "Ceart", were once ruled by what can be termed the Boar Kings, who are denoted in the Irish Annuls; with Nuada Uirc (Old Irish: Orc or Boar) being noted as one of the lines of kings of Guill and Irgull. Given in the Fragmentary Annuls of Ireland 178 is "Nuada Uirc, ri Guill & Irguill". Uirc or Orc, the kings of Ross Guill and Irgull are held synonymous with a boar, and the Crest Badge of the MacTavishes is a boar's head. The location noted for both the Boar Kings and the ancient Irish race of MacTavish being the same.

It is commonly held by the Campbells that Clan MacTavish descends from Tàmhas (Taus/Tavis Coir), son of Colin Mael Maith and a daughter of Suibhne Ruadh (Sween the Red of Castle Sween). Nothing certain is known of Taus Coir other than that he is listed in several traditional genealogies. The 17th century genealogy Ane Accompt of the Genealogie of the Campbells traces Colin Mael Maith back to the mythological King Arthur. Furthermore, this record references Colin Mael Maith as having one legitimate son and two illegitimate sons. The Accompt gives the legitimate son as "Gillespic" (Gilleasbaig) or "Archibald", ancestor of Clan Campbell; and the two illegitimate sons as Tàmhas Ceàrr ("Taius Coir") and Iomhar ("Iver"), ancestors of the MacTavishes and Clan MacIver.
 
According to Alastair Campbell of Airds, a more probable candidate for the ancestor of the clan, rather than the possibly mythological Tàmhas Ceàrr, is the historical Sir Thomas Cambel. Earlier in the 1970s, W. D. H. Sellar was also of the same opinion about Thomas. In 1292 Thomas' name is recorded on a list of landowners in the sheriffdom of Kintyre. In 1296 he signed the Ragman Roll as "Thomas Cambel among king's tenants in Perthshire". The next year he was released from imprisonment in the Tower of London. In 1308 he signed his name on a letter to the King of France. He was possibly dead by 1324, when his probable son, Duncan, was granted lands in Argyll for services rendered. In 1355, Duncan is listed as among "the Barons of Argyll" at an inquest in Inverleckan, under the name of "Duncanus MacThamais".

As mentioned in Popular Tales of the West Highlands, The Craignish Manuscript was drawn up by Alexander Campbell, in the employ of the Duke of Argyll, about 1706, and resulted from an examination of archives and charters, and the original genealogies drawn up by the MacEwens, heritable sheannachies [Gaelic: seanachaidh] of the Campbell chiefs of Argyll about 1650–1660, and gives Tavish Corr's parentage as different from Thomas Cambell, cited by Campbell of Airds, preceding. The Manuscript History cites Cailien Maol Maith as the father of Tavis, about 1100. The Manuscript History's content, considering the examination of multiple sources used to produce it, is closer in historical time frame than any other descriptive work, and therefore might be more accurate. Tweed mentions that Tavis' father, Cailien (Colin) Maol Maith, died at the siege of Dunstaffnage in 1110. A possible time frame for the birth of Tavis would then be somewhere around 1100–1111, based in part upon the texts of the old MacEwen shanachie.

Alastair Campbell of Airds says, "It seems probable that later compilers of the official genealogy, Ane Accompt (of the Genealogy of the Campbells), did not know of Sir Thomas "Cambel" and were anxious to insert the MacTavishes into the account somehow." This would appear as a very odd explanation since the MacEwens recorded the Campbell genealogies over many years. Seannachies would not have omitted someone as important as Thomas Cambel, who swore fealty to Edward I, King of England in the 1296 Ragman Roll. Alastair Campbell of Airds also says, "I doubt if it can be shown that the eponym of any Highland family is a fictitious character.", but Alastair Campbell of Airds places Tavis Corr in this predicament, and has referred to the clan as Tavish Campbells, insinuating the MacTavishes are Campbell descendants.

Historiographer William Skene noted: "The policy of the Argyll family led them to employ every means for the acquisition of property and the extension of the clan. One of the arts, which they used for the latter purpose, was to compel those clans which had become dependent upon them to adopt the name of Campbell, and this, when successful, was generally followed at an after period by the assertion that the clan was descended from the house of Argyll. In general, the clans thus adopted into the race of Campbell, are sufficiently marked out by their being promoted  only to the honor of being an illegitimate branch, but the tradition of the country invariably distinguishes between the real Campbells and those who were compelled to adopt their name." Tavis Corr, and his descendants (the MacTavishes) fit William Skene's description.

Tavis Corr could well be a real person in history. A local historian, the elderly Miss Nancy MacLeod, owner of Springbank house, told Sheriff-Substitute James Robertson, at Tobermory, the MacTavishes were descended from "Tavish mor MacMhieCalain" (That is: great Tavish, son of Calain, Cailien, or Colin).

The MacTavish Chiefs, did not, and do not consider themselves descendants of any of the Campbells, but from an Irish Pictish (Cruithni/Cruithne) origin. The Scottish Annual and Book of the Braemar Gathering of 1957, has recorded that Clan MacTavish is one of the ORIGINAL Scottish clans. 1957 is during the 200-year dormancy of the Chiefship of Clan MacTavish, and a full 40 years (1997) before Edward Stewart Dugald MacTavish was recognized by Lord Lyon, Sir Malcolm Innes of Edinburgh, as the Chief of Clan MacTavish. A clan is NOT a sept of another Clan. Clan MacTavish is distinct from Clan Campbell.

An interesting reference for the early beginnings of the MacTavish comes from the oldest learned society in Great Britain, the Philological Society of London. Its publication states, "...our author's father was married to a daughter of Campbell of Ashfield, and her mother was a daughter of MacTavifh or Thomfon of Dunardary (type/spelling as shown). This is a very ancient and respectable family, who have inherited the estate of Dunardary for upwards of nine hundred years.", and this is echoed in The Scots Magazine of 1793. If the MacTavishes were present at Dunardry 900 years before the 1793 date of two separate publications, that year would be approximately 893 AD. A MacTavish presence at Dunardry 900 years before Campbell's presence in 1220 produces a difficult situation for a Campbell descent, as presented by Campbell's history.

Supporting an earlier time frame for the MacTavishes is the Reverend John Dewar, of Argyll, who noted that there were Dalriadic landowners in Argyll who were not Campbells. Rev. Dewar mentions specifically; The MacArthurs, The MacLachlans, The MacNeills, and The MacTavishes. It is difficult to reconcile the inconsistencies presented about the origins of the MacTavishes, or that the MacTavishes are descended from the Campbells (having been considered a sept of Clan Campbell for generations), considering the Dunardry settlement date of approximately 893 A.D.  The Inverary Castle Website, approved by the 13th Duke of Argyll has listed, "The Campbells arrived in Argyll as part of a royal expedition in c.1220." How or why these inconsistencies abound is mysterious, and not easily rectified.

Interestingly, the MacTavishes appeared to have similar political aims that aligned them with the Campbell chiefs. The 10th Duke of Argyll, Niall Diarmid Campbell mentions, "'Though the MacTavishes were never a large or powerful clan, they have nevertheless been deemed a brave and honorable race, and numbers of them still live in Argyll under their old patronymic. Though the clan as a whole never seem to have made the slightest sign of adopting the name Campbell, they followed always the breach or banner of the Lords of Lochow in war and all hostings.

The chief line of MacTavishes is styled "MacTavish of Dunardry" (the Gaelic Dùn Àrd-Rìgh means "fort of the High King"). The meaning of Dunardry is displayed on the Forestry Commission Map of Dunardry. It is unknown who built the castle of Dunardry, or even when it was built. The castle is marked on a 1634 Timothy Pont map, the location being Knapdale, Argyll.  It was renovated in 1704 by Duncan MacTavish, and according to the 19th-century historian G.D. Mathews, it was owned by the MacTavishes. Today little of it exists, as it was torn down to make way for the Crinan Canal venture, which also changed the size, shape, and water level of Loch a' Bharain. The West of Scotland Archaeology report on Dunardry, mentions that the site is either medieval or post-medieval, which makes Dunardry an ancient site.

Battle of Flodden
The Battle of Flodden, Flodden Field, or occasionally Branxton (Brainston Moor) was a military combat in the War of the League of Cambrai between the Kingdom of England and the Kingdom of Scotland, resulting in an English victory. This was the bloodiest and most costly battle (in the number of lives lost) ever fought by Scotland. It is said that every Noble family in Scotland suffered a loss, with estimates of death ranging from 4000 to 17,000 (17,000 is likely an exaggerated number). The Battle claimed the lives of, Duncan, 6th Chief of MacTavish, Ean (Ewin or John), the 7th Chief of Clan MacTavish (the heir), Duncan's brother, Allan, and other MacTavishes, and Campbells, including the 2nd Earl of Argyll.

17th century and Civil War
1685: During Argyll's rebellion against James VII, (9th Earl of Argyll's part in the Monmouth Rebellion) Carnasserie is captured, partly blown up by a Royalist force commanded by MacLean of Torloisk, and left as a burnt-out shell. In 1690, Campbell of Auchinbreck petitioned for £20,000 Scots in compensation for the murder of his uncle during the siege and the damage caused
to Carnasserie. After the Castle was surrendered to Maclean's forces, under a treaty (supposedly peacefully) they hanged young Dugald MacTavish, Fiar of Dunardry within "Bow Draught" (length of the flight of an arrow) of the Castle. Among the most tragic sufferers in Knapdale was Marie Campbell, widow of John MacTavish of Dunardry, whose son Dugald had been hanged at Carnassary.

Dougal MacTavish who was a younger son of John MacTavish, 12th chief of Clan MacTavish, was killed during the Battle of Stirling (1648). The chief of Clan MacTavish having lost most of his arms in the battle (sword and musket), the Marquess of Argyll, chief of Clan Campbell, provided him with new weapons.

18th century and Jacobite uprisings
In 1715, the Jacobite cause saw its first failed attempt to place the Stuarts back on the throne of Scotland and England. During this time Chief Archibald MacTavish was sympathetic to the Jacobite cause but took no action to support either the Government or the Jacobites. Chief Archibald is said to have signed the address welcoming the Pretender, James Stewart, King du jour in Exile.

In 1745, both Chief Archibald and Dugald MacTavish, the Younger, were imprisoned at Dumbarton Castle, in September 1745 during the 1745 Jacobite Rising. For this reason, there was no formal leadership of Clan MacTavish of Dunardry within the Jacobite Army, and some of the MacTavishes found their way to fight within the ranks of their neighbor, MacIntosh. The MacTavishes were imprisoned based on the "treasonable" letters from Dugald MacTavish, the younger, to Sir James Campbell of Achinbreck indicating plans to raise their men in favor of Prince Charles and the Jacobite cause.

On 16 April 1746, at the Battle of Culloden, the Jacobite army was defeated by a much larger force of the British government army (5000 fighting for Prince Charles and 9000 fighting for the government). On that day, the Jacobite army of Prince Charles lost the battle, and the fate of the Jacobite cause was sealed.

After Culloden
What took place after the battle of Culloden in 1746 (Jacobite Rebellion or Rising of the '45) broke the Highlanders and their chiefs, those who had supported the Stuart Jacobite cause. The decision was made to crush the power of the Highlanders and destroy their traditional way of living."The chiefs no longer had the power to levy military service over their clansmen, nor could they control what the government was doing in the Highlands, or for that matter in the Lowlands, where most of the Lowland families had supported the English Government. "The property of those who had joined the rebellion was confiscated, and the 'Forfeited Estates' were administered directly by the government in pursuit of a policy of breaking up the Highlanders' way of life. The political, military, and judicial power of the clan chiefs was abolished. The Highlanders were forbidden on pain of death from wearing a tartan plaid (the kilt is the more modern equivalent), bearing arms, or carrying a dirk or dagger". General Cumberland loathed the Scots and considered Scotland to be a "vile spot". The MacTavish lands, however, were not held confiscated as both the MacTavish Chief and his son had been confined in Dumbarton Castle during the rebellion. MacTavish was released from prison and received a pardon for his Jacobite leanings under the General Pardon of 1747. By September 1747 Dugald's father, Archibald, had died, and he, Dugald MacTavish of Dunardery (Dunardry) succeeded his father as chief and is mentioned as one of the petitioners to the Masonic Lodge of Scotland to establish the Masonic Lodge of Inverary in Argyll. In 1757, just 10 years after Culloden, Dugald MacTavish is noted as one of the Duke (Archibald Campbell) of Argyll's chamberlains with authority to collect debts.

Highland Clearances
To their credit, there is no record of the MacTavish chiefs pressuring their tenants or clansmen to move off their lands.

After Culloden, a few of the MacTavish started to use the Thom(p)son spelling, although a few did before this time. The Chiefly line of MacTavish, however, retained the name MacTavish and remained seated at Dunardry. Parish registers and family groups of gravestones in Argyll express the transition of the name from MacTavish to Thomson. Some MacTavish also became known as Tawessons or Thompsons; the latter with the intrusive "p" inserted.

Sale of Dunardry
Dugald's son and heir, Lachlan MacTavish, succeeded his father in 1775. On 5 November 1785, the Estate of Dunardry was advertised for sale by public auction in December after Lachlan had fallen into financial trouble, partly due to judgment debts against him. The Dunardry estate was purchased initially by Campbell of Barbeck. At least two decisions by the Court of Session in Edinburgh arose from his father's lead role in failing to account for, and properly executed, the estate of Duncan Campbell of Kilduskland who had died in 1766. The sum of (£400 Sterling plus interest) was due to Elizabeth MacDonald of Largie, Kilduskland's niece, and £2,000 including interest to Ronald Campbell, Kilduskland's nephew, by 1780. Lachlan's portion of these two debts alone amounted to four times the annual income from the Dunardry lands (£392) as stated in the advertisement of 1785. Lachlan, his wife, and son Dugald, who was three years old, moved to Edinburgh where Lachlan was installed as Governor of Taxes for the Crown, living at St. James' Court, just off the Royal Mile.

In 1797, three years after work was started on the Crinan Canal, which subsequently divided the estate, Dunardry was purchased by Simon McTavish of Montreal, from Stratherrick, Invernesshire. Simon McTavish was born of the Garthbeg branch of the family and at this time was probably the richest man in Canada. Some Stratherrick McTavishes were considered a sept of Clan Fraser. Lachlan's son John George McTavish soon became a fur trader with the North West Company under Simon's patronage. However, the Dunardry Estate passed to Simon's son William, and then to Simon Jr. (both died young), and the property reverted to Lachlan's son, Dugald MacTavish of Dunardry, WS, who sold it to Malcolm of Poltallach.

20th century
Back in the 18th century Lachlan's son, Dugald, under age in 1796, did not register the MacTavish arms. As a grown man, with his duties as the Sheriff Substitute of Kintyre, he did not feel inclined to do so, as he was, already, legally known as MacTavish of Dunardry. He died without having re-registered the Arms. Unfortunately, this carried on with his son William MacTavish who had moved to the "wilds" of Canada. William also declined to register the Arms. It is nominally suggested by Lord Lyon that at least every other generation re-register the Chiefly Arms, to avoid dormancy of the Clan. As a result of William not matriculating for the arms, the Chiefly line was considered "lost", or dormant, until 1949, when Lord Lyon, Sir Thomas Innes of Learney, contacted the MacTavish family in Canada, advising them that they were the Chiefly line, inviting them to petition for the Arms and Chiefship of the Clan. No petition was lodged with the Court of Lord Lyon and the Chiefship remained dormant when in 1992 Edward Stewart Dugald MacTavish petitioned for the Arms and Chiefship of the clan. He was recognized and enrolled in the Titles of Chief of the Name and Arms, and Chief of the Clan MacTavish in 1997.  The Chiefship was reinstated with the territorial title of 'MacTavish of Dunardry.

Revival
The search for the rightful heir to the Chiefship of Clan MacTavish was found when Mrs. Margaret MacLeaod was writing The Letters of Letitia Hargrave (Letitia MacTavish Hargrave was the daughter of Sheriff Dugald MacTavish at Campbeltown, Kintrye, Scotland) for the Champlain Society. Mrs. MacLeod's husband, Allan MacLeod, M.D., had taken over the medical practice of one James MacTavish, son of Governor William MacTavish, HBC, at Red River. Mrs. MacLoed stumbled onto the connection through her research and wrote to the Lord Lyon King of Arms, who in turn had contacted the MacTavish family in Canada in 1950, advising them of the heir-ship and urging J.W. MacTavish to Matriculate. John William MacTavish (J.W.) was informed from his service in World War I, living on a small government pension, and did not matriculate, even though Lord Lyon reached out to J.W. while he was at Queen Mary Veterans' Hospital in Montreal, Canada.

Clan MacTavish experienced a dormancy of 200 years when Lachlan MacTavish was the last Chief to register at that time. The dormancy ended in 1997 when Edward Stewart Dugald MacTavish of Dunardry matriculated. His son, Steven Edward Dugald MacTavish of Dunardry is the current Chief of Clan MacTavish.

William MacTavish, Hudson's Bay Company Governor of Assiniboia and Rupert's Land (afterward Manitoba) whose great-grandson, Edward Stewart Dugald MacTavish of Dunardry, was enrolled by the Court of tord Lyon on 23 July 1997 and granted the Arms and Title of Chief of the Clan MacTavish of Dunardry, and Chief of the Name and Arms of MacTavish, being so recognized, he became the 26th Chief of the Clan in an unbroken line. He died on 19 June 2005 at his home in Vancouver, BC. He is succeeded by his only son and heir, the 27th Chief, Steven Edward Dugald MacTavish of Dunardry, a member of the Standing Council of Scottish Chiefs.

Clan profile

Chief
The current chief of Clan MacTavish is Steven Edward Dugald MacTavish of Dunardry, Chief of the Name and Arms of MacTavish. He is the 27th Hereditary Chief of Clan MacTavish from an unbroken line. He assumed leadership of the clan upon the death of his father, Edward Stewart Dugald MacTavish, the 26th Chief.

Origin of the name
The clan name MacTavish is an Anglicised form of the Gaelic MacTàmhais, which translates to Thomson or Thom(p)son in English. This name is a patronymic form of the Gaelic personal name Tamhus (pronounced Tavus or Tavis), which is translated to Thomas in English.

"The Pict word for twin was TAUUS (pronounced tavis). It became Tamhais in Gaelic and Tavish in English."

The Gaelic name Mac Tamhais is pronounced similarly to 'MacTavis' or 'MacTavish' (the "mh" in Gaelic pronounced as the "v" in the English word "very"). In old charters, the name had many variant spellings. Some spellings found within old Scottish charters, post-Culloden parish registers, and in "The Commons Argyll" appear as MacAvis, MacCamis, McCawis,McKavis, McKnavis, M'Ash, MacAnish, mcTais, MacTavifh and mcThavish, to give a few. It seems that from near the end of the 17th century, the spellings, MacTavish and/or Thom(p)son or Thomas were the most common. Variations in surname spelling within one document are often seen for the same person.

Clan symbols
The crest badge suitable for members of Clan MacTavish contains the crest and motto of the clan chief. The crest is blazoned a boar's head erased or langued proper. The motto is NON OBLITUS, which seems to translate from Latin as "not forgetful". But this is only one translation. Latin authorities often site non-oblitus associated with funerary text, in which the deceased is commemorated. Thus, Non oblitus post mortem me, expounds the sentiment,
"Do not forget me after death". Non Oblitus standing alone expounds "Not Forgotten". It would then seem unlikely that the MacTavish motto would be an echoing of the Campbell Motto, Ne Obliviscaris, "Not Forgetful" (which is the correct translation); which seems to be so often translated as, "Do Not Forget".  The MacTavish family name was wrongfully claimed by Clan Campbell, during the 200-year period when the chiefly line was "lost", until 1997 when the "Chief of the Clan MacTavish" was recognized by the Lord Lyon.

Chiefly arms
In 1793, John Hooke-Campbell, Lord Lyon King of Arms, granted the following coat of arms to Lachlan MacTavish of Dunardry: Quarterly, 1st and 4th a Gyronny of eight Sable and Or; 2nd and 3rd, Argent, a buck's head cabossed Gules attired Or on a chief engrailed Azure a cross crosslet fitchèe between two mullets Or. Crest a boar's head erased Or langued Gules. Motto: NON OBLITUS. These arms were record in the Public Register of All Arms and Bearings in Scotland, Volume 1, Folio 563, dated 17 April 1793. The arms display in the first and fourth quarters the gyronny prominent in Campbell heraldry reversed for difference. Apparently the gynronnies were included by the Campbell Lord Lyon because the MacTavishes had been followers (not a sept) of the Campbells since their occupation of Argyll. The second and third quarters are similar to, but differenced from Thomson of that Ilk, apparently because Tavish translates to Thomas, and MacTavish bears the meaning of "Son of Tavis/Thomas".

On 13 December 1997, the Lord Lyon affixed his seal on the matriculation of Edward Stewart Dugald MacTavish of Dunardry, recognizing him as Chief of Clan MacTavish, granted him arms similar to the grant of 1793 as follows. Quarterly, On 1st and 4th a Gyronny of eight Sable and Or; 2nd and 3rd, Argent, a buck's head cabossed Gules attired Or on a chief engrailed Azure a cross crosslet fitchèe between two mullets Argent. Crest a boar's head erased Or langued Gules. Motto: NON OBLITUS. The Cross crosslet and mullets were changed from Or (gold) to Argent (silver), but this change wants for a reason.

In 2002 the Lord Lyon King of Arms re-granted Dugald MacTavish of Dunardry arms with certain amendments. Lord Lyon switched the Campbell gyronny from the first and fourth quarters to the second and third quarters. The new arms are blazoned Quarterly, 1st and 4th, Argent, a Buck's Head cabossed Gules attired Or on a Chief engrailed Azure a cross crosslet fitchèe between two mullets of the First; 2nd and 3rd, Gyronny of eight Sable and Or. Above the Shield is placed a Helm befitting his degree with a Mantling Azure doubled Argent, and on a Wreath of the Liveries is set for Crest a boar's head erased Or langued Proper, and in an Escrol over the same this Motto "NON OBLITUS".

On 30 August 2013 The Court of the Lord Lyon matriculated new arms for Chief Steven MacTavish of Dunardry as follows: Quarterly, first and fourth, Argent, a buck's head Gules attired Or, on a chief engrailed Azure a cross-crosslett between two mullets Argent, second, gyronny of eight Sable and Or; and third, Argent a lymphad sails furled oars in action Sable flagged Gules. Above the Shield is place an Helm befitting his degree, with mantling Gules doubled Argent, and on a wreath of the liveries is set for crest, a boar's head erased Or langued Proper, and in an scroll over the same this Motto 'NON OBLITUS'. Recorded on the 98th page, of the 91st Volume of the Public Register of All Arms and Bearing in Scotland. The addition of a Lymphad (ancient sailing ship) was added as the petitioner showed that this adamant was historical as used by a MacTavish ancestor. The new arms appear on this page.

Septs
Names, variant names, and septs for Clan MacTavish include Cash, Holmes, Kash, Kaish, MacAishe, MacCamish, MacCash, MacCavish, MacComb, MacCombie, MacComich, MacComish, MaComie, Macomie, MacCosh, MacIltavish, MacIlTavish, MacLaws, MacLawes, MacElhose, MacLehose, MacTais, MacTaus, MacTauais, MacTavish, McTavish, Mactavish, Mactavis, M’Tavish, MacTawes, MacTawis, MacTawys, MacTawes, MacTeague, Stephens, Stephenson, Stevens, Stevenson, Tavish, Tawes, Tawse, Tawesson, Tawis, Teague, Thom, Thomas, Thomason, Thomasson, Thompson, Thomson, Tod, Todd, Tomey and all variant spellings.

References

Further reading

External links
Clan MacTavish Official Website
Clan MacTavish AboutUs Wiki
MacTavish Heraldry

MacTavish